Autoamerican is the fifth studio album by American rock band Blondie. The album spawned two singles from this album, "The Tide Is High" and "Rapture". "The Tide Is High" hit number one in several countries, including the US and the UK. "Rapture" became the first rap song ever to reach number one on the singles chart in the US. It also reached number five in the UK and number four in Australia.

Background
The album was a radical departure for the band, with the opening track "Europa" setting the pace. The track is a dramatic instrumental overture featuring orchestral arrangements and ending with vocalist Debbie Harry declaiming a passage about automobile culture over an electronic soundtrack. Besides rock and pop tracks, the band explored a wide range of other musical genres: "Here's Looking at You" and "Faces" show jazz and blues influences, "The Tide Is High" was a cover of the Paragons' 1967 Jamaican ska song, whereas "Rapture" combined funk, rock, jazz, and even saw them embracing the then-emerging genre of rap. The closing track, "Follow Me", was a cover of a torch song from Alan Jay Lerner and Frederick Loewe's 1960 Broadway musical Camelot.

Producer Mike Chapman insisted the band record in Los Angeles. Guitarist Chris Stein lamented: "Every day we get up, stagger into the blinding sun, [and] drive past a huge Moon-mobile from some ancient sci-fi movie." Drummer Clem Burke welcomed the change: "Autoamerican was fun. We got to spend two months in California. I'm always up for a free ride." However, the band insisted on the cover artwork shot being from their hometown, posing on a roof near New York's Broadway and Eighth (more precisely 300 Mercer Street). The image was taken from a commissioned painting by artist Martin Hoffman (1935–2013).

In a 2020 interview with American Songwriter, to mark the 40th anniversary of the album, Stein revealed the intended title was Coca Cola, as it sounded "very American", but The Coca-Cola Company declined the idea.

The band released two singles from this album, "The Tide Is High" and "Rapture". "The Tide Is High" hit number one in several countries, including the US and the UK. "Rapture" became the first rap song ever to reach number one on the singles chart in the US. It also reached number five in the UK and number four in Australia.

Autoamerican was digitally remastered and reissued with two bonus tracks by Chrysalis Records in the UK in 1994 which included the extended 12″ Special Disco Mix versions of "Rapture" and its B-side "Live It Up", from 1981. The album was again remastered and re-released by EMI-Capitol in 2001, again featuring the extended version of "Rapture" along with the full-length version of their number-one single "Call Me" (from the film soundtrack to American Gigolo), as well as "Suzy & Jeffrey" which was originally the B-side to "The Tide Is High".

Track listing

Personnel
Credits adapted from the liner notes of Autoamerican.

Blondie
 Clem Burke – drums
 Jimmy Destri – electric keyboards
 Nigel Harrison – bass
 Deborah Harry – vocals
 Frank Infante – guitar
 Chris Stein – guitar, tympani

Additional musicians
 Wah Wah Watson – guitar on "Live It Up"
 Howard Kaylan – vocals on "T-Birds"
 Mark Volman – vocals on "T-Birds"
 Tom Scott – saxophone on "Rapture" and "Faces", Lyricon on "Do the Dark"
 Ollie Brown – percussion on "The Tide Is High"
 Emil Richards – percussion on "The Tide Is High"
 Alex Acuña – percussion on "The Tide Is High"
 Steve Goldstein – piano on "Faces", synthesizers on "Follow Me"
 B-Girls – backing vocals on "Live It Up"
 Jimmie Haskell – string and horn arrangements on "Here's Looking at You", "The Tide Is High", "Europa" and "Go Through It"
 Ray Brown – bass on "Faces"
 Scott Lesser – percussion on "Live It Up"

Technical
 Mike Chapman – production
 Lenise Bent – engineering
 Doug Schwartz – engineering assistance
 Gary Boatner – engineering assistance
 Kevin Flaherty – production (2001 reissue)

Artwork
 Martin Hoffman – painting
 John Van Hamersveld – design
 Karen Knecht – peach
 Billy Bass – art direction

Charts

Weekly charts

Year-end charts

Certifications

References

Bibliography

 

1980 albums
Albums arranged by Jimmie Haskell
Albums produced by Mike Chapman
Albums with cover art by John Van Hamersveld
Blondie (band) albums
Chrysalis Records albums